From E to U: Volume 1 is the seventh studio album by American R&B singer Eric Benét. Recorded exclusively for the Asian music market, it was released by Benét's own label Jordan House and Primary Wave on May 28, 2014, with distribution handled by Warner Music Japan. A cover album, it includes the duet "Almost Paradise" with Korean pop singer Ailee. It was later made available worldwide on streaming services such as Spotify.

Critical reception
SoulTracks editor Chris Rizik called the album "a hot mess." He wrote that "fans understand that music is not only art, it is commerce. But From E to U: Volume 1 doubles down on the commerce and saves the art for another day, making it disappointing even by the lower standard of covers albums. It is a cynical snoozer of a project that appears designed only for a quick buck in a land far to the East of us."

Track listing
All tracks produced by Eric Benét and Demonte Posey.

Personnel 
Credits adapted from the liner notes of From E to U: Volume 1.
 Eric Benét – producer
 Andy Duncan – guitar
 Donald Hayes – arranger, horns
 Demonte Posey – drum programming, keyboards, producer

Charts

Release history

References

2014 albums
Eric Benét albums
Covers albums